The 1965 Football Cup of Ukrainian SSR among KFK  was the annual season of Ukraine's football knockout competition for amateur football teams.

Competition schedule

Preliminary round

|}
Replay

|}
Notes:
 The match between Kolhospnyk Buchach and Karpaty Borshniv ended in 2–0 win by Buchach.

First qualification round

|}
Notes:

Second qualification round

|}
Notes:

Quarterfinals (1/4)

|}

Semifinals (1/2)

|}
Replay

|}

Final

|}

See also
 1965 KFK competitions (Ukraine)

External links
 1965. regional-football.ru

Ukrainian Amateur Cup
Ukrainian Amateur Cup
Amateur Cup